Krossberg is a village in Stavanger municipality in Rogaland county, Norway.  The village is located in the city of Stavanger in the borough of Madla between the Stokkavatnet and Hålandsvatnet lakes.

References

Villages in Rogaland
Stavanger